Laroc Club is an open air superclub in Valinhos, Brazil. Occupying an area of ​​approximately 500,000 square feet of space, Laroc is capable of hosting up to 5,000 guests. The club is a venue for EDM and other dance music with performances by artists including Armin van Buuren, Hardwell, Alok, Vintage Culture, Axwell, and others. Laroc Club is currently ranked 9 at the DJ Mag´s Top 100 Clubs.

History 
Founded by Mario Sergio de Albuquerque, Silvio Soldera and Fauze Abdouch, Laroc Club first opened in October 2015. The opening night featured Nicky Romero as the headliner artist.

Affiliated clubs
In 2018 Laroc Club opened an affiliate club in Valinhos, Brazil named Ame Club. The opening night featured Joris Voorn as the headliner artist.

Awards and nominations

DJ Magazine's top 100 Clubs

References

External links 
 

Nightclubs
Electronic dance music venues
2015 establishments in Brazil
music venues in Brazil